Paddy Kelly is a footballer from County Kerry. He won an All-Ireland Medal with Kerry in 2004, and also won an Munster Minor Championship in 2001. He played club football with a number of different clubs, specifically Ballylongford, John Mitchels and Listowel Emmets.

Underage

Kelly first played with Kerry at minor level in 2001. Wins over Waterford and Corkseen allowed Kelly to pick up a Munster medal. Kerry later lost to Dublin in the All-Ireland semi-final.

He later linked up with the Kerry Under 21 team. In 2002 he was Right Half Forward as Kerry overcame Clare in the Munster final. They later lost to Galway in the All-Ireland semi-final.

He was a regular again in 2003. Wins over Limerick and Tipperary seen Kelly line out in a second Munster final with Waterford. Kerry were expected to win a second title in a row, however Waterford socked Kelly and co on a 2-08 to 1-09 scoreline.

He lined out with the Under 21 team for a third and final year in 2004. Win's over Clare and Waterford seen Kelly line out in his third Munster final in row. However Kerry came up short against Cork in his last game in the grade.

Senior

Kelly was a surprise choose for Kerry's 2004 All-Ireland Senior Football Championship quarter-final with Dublin at Midfield. He appeared as a sub and scored a point in the semi-final win over Derry. He again appeared as Kerry overcame Mayo to take the All-Ireland title on a 1-20 to 2-09 scoreline.

References

 
 

Year of birth missing (living people)
Living people
Ballylongford Gaelic footballers
John Mitchels (Kerry) Gaelic footballers
Listowel Emmets Gaelic footballers
Kerry inter-county Gaelic footballers
Munster inter-provincial Gaelic footballers